Blocco-Juve (Juve Block), also known as Blocco Juventus, was the nickname of the group of Juventus F.C. players called up to have been the backbone to the Italy national football team managed by Enzo Bearzot to win the 1982 FIFA World Cup Final and reached the semifinals of the 1978 FIFA World Cup and in the 1980 European Championship.

With this group the side managed by Giovanni Trapattoni dominated the Italian football and had one of the best teams in Europe and the world during the second half of the 1970s first half of the 1980s, winning amongst others six national championships, two Italian Cups and all international club competitions (world record), and included Dino Zoff, Claudio Gentile, Gaetano Scirea, Antonio Cabrini, Marco Tardelli, Roberto Bettega and Paolo Rossi.

Players

Notable Italy players during their careers at Juventus in this time period.

 Pietro Anastasi
 Romeo Benetti
 Roberto Bettega
 Antonio Cabrini
 Franco Causio
 Antonello Cuccureddu
 Giuseppe Furino
 Claudio Gentile
 Francesco Morini 
 Paolo Rossi
 Gaetano Scirea
 Luciano Spinosi
 Marco Tardelli
 Dino Zoff

See also
 Italy national football team
 Juventus F.C. and the Italy national football team
 Juventus F.C. in European football
 Nazio-Juve
 List of players to have won all international club competitions
 List of players to have won the three main UEFA club competitions

Footnotes and references

Bibliography
 
 

Blocco-Juve
Blocco-Juve
Blocco-Juve
Nicknamed groups of association football players
1977–78 in Italian football
1978–79 in Italian football
1979–80 in Italian football
1980–81 in Italian football
1981–82 in Italian football
1982–83 in Italian football
1983–84 in Italian football
1984–85 in Italian football
Italy at the 1978 FIFA World Cup
Italy at the 1982 FIFA World Cup
Italy at UEFA Euro 1980
Association football player non-biographical articles